Numerous world records and Olympic records were set in various events at the 2020 Summer Olympics in Tokyo. Some events occur over non-standard conditions (e.g., canoeing) in which case there are no official records, just "world best" and "olympic best" results.

Archery

Athletics

Canoe sprint

Track cycling

Modern pentathlon

Rowing

World Rowing do not recognize records due to the huge variability that weather conditions can have on times. Instead, they observe best times over the international racing distance of 2000 metres.

Shooting

Sport climbing

Swimming

Men

Women

Legend: r – First leg of relay

All world records (WR) are consequently Olympic records (OR).

Mixed

Weightlifting

Men

Women

Footnotes

References

2020 Summer Olympics
2016 Summer Olympics